Maarifa Street (Magic Realism 2) is an album by Jon Hassell. It was released on the Nyen label in 2005. The album was recorded live in Milan, Montreal and Paris, with the exception of "New Gods" which was recorded in Game Room Studios, Los Angeles. It was dedicated to the memory of Mati Klarwein.

Track listing

Personnel
Credits adapted from liner notes.

Pete Lockett - drums

Musicians
 Jon Hassell – trumpet, keyboards
 Peter Freeman – bass, percussion, programming
 Rick Cox – guitar
 Dhafer Youssef – voice, oud
 John Beasley – keyboards
 Abdou M'boup – drums (original source performance)
 Paolo Fresu – trumpet, effects
 Pete Lockett – drums
 Dino J.A. Deane – live sampling

Technical personnel
 Jon Hassell – production
 Peter Freeman – co-production, mixing engineer
 Jean-Michel Reusser - executive producer
 Scott Hull – mastering
 John Coulthart – design
 Mati Klarwein – artwork

References

External links
 Official Website
 

2005 albums
Jon Hassell albums
Albums with cover art by Mati Klarwein